Stefano Travaglia was the defending champion but chose not to defend his title.

Nerman Fatić won the title after defeating Damir Džumhur 6–3, 6–4 in the final.

Seeds

Draw

Finals

Top half

Bottom half

References

External links
Main draw
Qualifying draw

Sibiu Open - 1
2022 Singles